The 2016–17 National League B season is the 70th ice hockey season of Switzerland's second tier hockey league, the National League B.

HC Ajoie is the defending champions as they have not handed in their application for a promotion to this year's NLA season.

Teams

Regular season
The regular season started on 9 September 2016 and ended on 12 February 2017.

Playoffs

League Qualification

HC Ambrì-Piotta vs. SC Langenthal

References

External links
 
 
 National League B, hockeyarchives  

National League B seasons
2016–17 in Swiss ice hockey
Swiss